Petrovsky is a rural locality (a settlement) in Lukovsky Selsoviet, Pankrushikhinsky District, Altai Krai, Russia. The population was 90 as of 2013. There are 2 streets.

Geography 
Petrovsky is located 27 km north of Pankrushikha (the district's administrative centre) by road. Lensky is the nearest rural locality.

References 

Rural localities in Pankrushikhinsky District